Quistello is a comune (municipality) in the Province of Mantua in the Italian region Lombardy, located about  southeast of Milan and about  southeast of Mantua.

Quistello borders the following municipalities: Concordia sulla Secchia, Moglia, Quingentole, San Benedetto Po, San Giacomo delle Segnate, San Giovanni del Dosso, Schivenoglia, Sustinente.

References

External links
 Official website